Jean Raphaël Adrien René Viviani (8 November 18637 September 1925) was a French politician of the Third Republic, who served as Prime Minister for the first year of World War I.  He was born in Sidi Bel Abbès, in French Algeria. In France he sought to protect the rights of socialists and trade union workers.

Biography

René Viviani was born in Algeria in a family of Italian immigrants. His parliamentary career began in 1893, when he was elected deputy of the fifth ward in Paris. He retained this office until 1902, when he failed to be reelected, but four years later he was elected deputy of the Department of Creuse.  In the same year he entered the cabinet of Georges Clemenceau.   At an early age he associated himself with the Socialist party, soon becoming one of its most brilliant orators and prominent leaders.  When the party was reorganized in 1904 into the Unified Socialist party, Viviani, like fellow Socialist Aristide Briand, stayed outside, and thenceforth called himself an Independent Socialist.  He served as Minister of Public Instruction in the ministry of M. Doumergue. Viviani was an antisemite, arguing that "antisemitism is the best form of social struggle".

In the spring of 1914 an exceptionally radical chamber was elected, and for a while it seemed that they would be unable to agree upon any one for Premier, but finally, he was appointed Prime Minister on 13 June 1914, by President Poincaré.  He received a vote of confidence of 370 to 137.  The chief issues were the maintenance of the law requiring three years' service in the army and provision for a loan of 1,800,000,000 francs ($360,000,000) for military preparations.  Viviani supported both of these measures.  During the July Crisis, he was largely dominated by President Poincaré. He retained the premiership for the first year of the First World War, but his tenure was undistinguished.

On 26 August 1914 Viviani reorganized his cabinet on a war basis with Alexandre Millerand replacing Adolphe Messimy as Minister of War. Along with President Poincaré and War Minister Millerand he attended a June 1915 meeting of Joffre (Commander-in-Chief) and his Army Group Commanders (Foch, Castelnau and Dubail), a rare attempt at political oversight at this stage of the war.

By autumn 1915 Viviani's government was in trouble following the resignation of Delcassé as Foreign Minister, the unsuccessful western front offensive and the entry of Bulgaria into the war. Although he survived a no confidence vote by 372–9, there were many abstentions. General Gallieni agreed to replace Millerand as Minister of War, but other French politicians refused to join Viviani's government, so he resigned on 27 October 1915. Viviani served as Vice-President of the Council of Ministers (Deputy PM) and Gallieni as War Minister in Aristide Briand's new ministry.

In April 1917 Viviani led a mission to the US, which had just entered the war "associated with" the Allies. He was overshadowed by Marshal Joffre, who attracted much more attention from the American press.

During Viviani's time as prime minister, a law was adopted in July 1915 providing for special boards to fix such a wage for women employed in home-work in the clothing industry.
In May 1919 the Chamber of Deputies finally debated the bill proposed by Paul Dussaussoy in 1906 for limited women's suffrage. Viviani gave an eloquent speech in its support, and the chamber voted in its favour by 344 to 97.

Viviani's First Government, 13 June – 26 August 1914
René Viviani – President of the Council and Minister of Foreign Affairs  
Adolphe Messimy – Minister of War  
Louis Malvy – Minister of the Interior  
Joseph Noulens – Minister of Finance  
Maurice Couyba – Minister of Labour and Social Security Provisions  
Jean-Baptiste Bienvenu-Martin – Minister of Justice  
Armand Gauthier de l'Aude – Minister of Marine
Victor Augagneur – Minister of Public Instruction and Fine Arts.  
Fernand David – Minister of Agriculture  
Maurice Raynaud – Minister of Colonies  
René Renoult – Minister of Public Works  
Gaston Thomson – Minister of Commerce, Industry, Posts, and Telegraphs

Changes
3 August 1914 – Gaston Doumergue succeeds Viviani as Minister of Foreign Affairs.   succeeds l'Aude as Minister of Marine. Albert Sarraut succeeds Augagneur as Minister of Public Instruction and Fine Arts.

Viviani's Second Ministry, 26 August 1914 – 29 October 1915
René Viviani – President of the Council
Théophile Delcassé – Minister of Foreign Affairs
Alexandre Millerand – Minister of War
Louis Malvy – Minister of the Interior
Alexandre Ribot – Minister of Finance
Jean-Baptiste Bienvenu-Martin – Minister of Labour and Social Security Provisions
Aristide Briand – Minister of Justice  
Victor Augagneur – Minister of Marine
Albert Sarraut – Minister of Public Instruction and Fine Arts
Fernand David – Minister of Agriculture
Gaston Doumergue – Minister of Colonies  
Marcel Sembat – Minister of Public Works
Gaston Thomson – Minister of Commerce, Industry, Posts, and Telegraphs
Jules Guesde – Minister without Portfolio

Changes
13 October 1915 – Viviani succeeds Delcassé as Minister of Foreign Affairs.

See also

 Square René Viviani is a small public space near Notre-Dame in central Paris, named for Viviani

Further reading
 Clark, Christopher. The sleepwalkers: How Europe went to war in 1914 (2012).

References

External links

 

 
 
 

1863 births
1925 deaths
People from Sidi Bel Abbès
People of French Algeria
Pieds-Noirs
French people of Italian descent
Republican-Socialist Party politicians
Prime Ministers of France
Members of the 6th Chamber of Deputies of the French Third Republic
Members of the 7th Chamber of Deputies of the French Third Republic
Members of the 9th Chamber of Deputies of the French Third Republic
Members of the 10th Chamber of Deputies of the French Third Republic
Members of the 11th Chamber of Deputies of the French Third Republic
Members of the 12th Chamber of Deputies of the French Third Republic
French Senators of the Third Republic
Senators of Creuse
French people of World War I